Hispaniodirphia is a genus of moths in the family Saturniidae first described by Claude Lemaire in 1999.

Species
Hispaniodirphia lemaireiana Rougerie & Herbin, 2006
Hispaniodirphia plana (Walker, 1855)

References

Hemileucinae